Kai Arne Engelstad (born 21 December 1954, in Oslo) is a former speed skater from Norway.

Engelstad specialised on the sprint, with his strongest distance being the 1,000 m. He had his best year in 1984 when he became Norwegian Sprint Champion for the third time, won bronze on the 1,000 m at the Winter Olympics of Sarajevo, and won another bronze medal when he finished third at the World Sprint Championships in Trondheim. Engelstad represented the club Aktiv SK.

Medals
An overview of medals won by Engelstad at important championships he participated in, listing the years in which he won each:

Personal records
To put these personal records in perspective, the WR column lists the official world records on the dates that Engelstad skated his personal records.

Engelstad has an Adelskalender score of 176.591 points.

References 
 Kai Arne Engelstad at SkateResults.com
 Kai Arne Engelstad. Deutsche Eisschnelllauf Gemeinschaft e.V. (German Skating Association).
 Personal records from Jakub Majerski's Speedskating Database
 Evert Stenlund's Adelskalender pages
 Historical World Records. International Skating Union.
 National Championships results. Norges Skøyteforbund (Norwegian Skating Association).

External links
 
 
 
 

1954 births
Living people
Norwegian male speed skaters
Olympic speed skaters of Norway
Olympic bronze medalists for Norway
Olympic medalists in speed skating
Speed skaters at the 1980 Winter Olympics
Speed skaters at the 1984 Winter Olympics
Medalists at the 1984 Winter Olympics
World Sprint Speed Skating Championships medalists
Sportspeople from Oslo
20th-century Norwegian people